The rosters of all participating teams at the men's tournament of the 2013 Rugby World Cup Sevens.

Pool A

Coach:  Michael O'Connor
Tom Cusack
Jesse Parahi
Sean McMahon
Bernard Foley
Matt Lucas
Con Foley
Cameron Clark
James Stannard
Ed Jenkins (c)
Lewis Holland
Luke Morahan
Shannon Walker

Coach:  Frédéric Pomarel
Vincent Deniau
Manoël Dall'igna
Jean-Baptiste Mazoué (c)
Terry Bouhraoua
Paul Albaladejo
Julien Jane
Jean-Marcellin Buttin
Jonathan Laugel
Steeve Barry
Julien Candelon
Jean-Baptiste Gobelet
Vincent Inigo

Ignacio Martin
Julen Goia
Javier Canosa
Pablo Feijoo (c)
Facundo Lavino
Martin Heredia
Pedro Martin
Jaike Carter
Javier Carrión
Glen Rolls
Matías Tudela
Marcos Poggi

Haithem Chelly
Sofiane Zaafouri
Khaled Zegden
Aymen Gloulou
Chemseddine Khalifa
Badie Dahmoul
Abbes Kherfani
Abdelmajid Zemzem
Chadi Jabri
Kais Aissa
Mohsen Essid
Mohamed Gara Ali (c)

Pool B

Coach:  Tomohiro Segawa
Lote Daulako Tuqiri
Yusaku Kuwazuru
Lepuha Latuila
Opeti Faeamani
Daisuke Natsui
Katsuyuki Sakai (c)
Shuhei Narita
Shohei Toyosima
Kosuke Hoshino
Shota Emi
Seiyu Kohara
Kazushi Hano

Vladimir Ostroushko
Stanislav Bondarev
Vladislav Lazarenko
Ilya Babaev
Dmitry Perov (c)
Igor Klyuchnikov
Nikolay Goroshilov
Alexander Ianiushkin
Igor Galinovskiy
Vasily Artemyev
Denis Simplikevich
Victor Gresev

Coach:  Stephen Gemmell
Scott Riddell
Michael Fedo
Struan Dewar
Alex Glashan
Colin Gregor (c)
Christopher Dean
Andrew Turnbull
Colin Shaw
Jim Thompson
Michael Maltman
Mark Robertson
James M. Johnstone

Coach:  Paul Treu
Chris Dry
Philip Snyman
Ryno Benjamin
S'bura Sithole
Cornal Hendricks
Kyle Brown (c)
Branco du Preez
Stephan Dippenaar
Cheslin Kolbe
Cecil Afrika
Seabelo Senatla
Sampie Mastriet

Pool C

Coach:  Mike Friday
Horace Otieno
Oscar Ouma Achieng
Patrice Agunda
Felix Ayange
Eden Agero
Humphrey Kayange
Biko Adema
Andrew Amonde (c)
Michael Wanjala
Lavin Asego
Collins Injera
Willy Ambaka

Coach:  Al Caravelli
Andrew Wolff
Ryan Eugene Clarke
Oliver Saunders
Gareth Holgate
Jake Letts 
Joseph Matthews
Justin Coveney
Kenneth Stern
Michael Letts (c)
Matthew Saunders (c)
Sean Lynch
Patrice Olivier

Coach:  Stephen Betham
Fa'atoina Autagavaia
Afa Aiono (c)
Alafoti Faosiliva
Fa’alemiga Selesele
Lio Lolo
Uale Mai
Lolo Lui
Alatasi Tupou
Rupeni Levasa
Ken Siaosi Pisi
Paul Perez
Tom Iosefo

Coach:  Gilbert Nyamutsamba
Fortunate Chipendu
Jacques Leitao (c)
Mike Morris
Kelvin Magunje
Lucky Sithole
Daniel Hondo
Tafadzwa Chitokwindo
Njabulo Ndlovu
Gardner Nechironga
Garth Zieglar
Tengai Nemadire
Wensley Mbanje

Pool D

Coach:  Geraint John
Mike Fuailefau
Thyssen de Goede
Nanyak Dala
John Moonlight (c)
Justin Douglas
Sean Duke
Phil Mack
Lucas Hammond
Nathan Hirayama
Ciaran Hearn
Harry Jones
Taylor Paris

Coach:  Kakhaber Alania
Zura Dzneladze
Giorgi Jimsheladze
Viktor Kolelishvili
Bidzina Samkharadze
Merab Kvirikashvili
Merab Sharikadze
Alexander Todua
Bakhva Kobakhidze
Revaz Gigauri
Shavleg Makharashvili
Irakli Gegenava
Giorgi Pruidze

Coach:  Gordon Tietjens
Pita Ahki
Tim Mikkelson
Sam Dickson
DJ Forbes (c)
Lote Raikabula
Junior Tomasi Cama
Scott Curry
Gillies Kaka
Sherwin Stowers
Waisake Naholo
Kurt Baker
David Raikuna
Bryce Heem

Coach:  Alexander Magleby
Carlin Isles
Nick Edwards
Andrew Durutalo
Shalom Suniula
Zack Test (c)
Matt Hawkins
Folau Niua
Jack Halalilo
Maka Unufe
Mike Palefau
Colin Hawley
Brett Thompson

Pool E

Coach:  Alifereti Dere
Leone Nakarawa
Lepani Botia (c)
Waisea Nayacalevu
Nemani Nagusa
Watisoni Votu
Joji Ragamate
Jasa Veremalua
Vereniki Goneva
Ilai Tinai
Alipate Ratini
Metuisela Talebula
Samisoni Viriviri

Fe'ofa'aki Holoia
Fautasi Tonga Ma'u
Simana Halaifonua
Sione Filila Taufa
Pepa Koloamatangi
Kilifi Latu (c)
Siosaia Palei
Sosefo Maake
Sonatane Takulua
Tevita Tuipulotu
Fetongi Tuinauvai
Michael Toloke

Juan Ormaechea
Juan Martín Llovet
Alfonso Falcon
Agustín Ormaechea
Gabriel Puig (c)
Felipe Berchesi
Federico Favaro
Gastón Mieres
Santiago Gibernau
Ian Schmidt
Guillermo Lijtenstein
Francisco Vecino

Coach:  Paul John
Gareth Davies
Chris Knight
Lee Williams (c)
Alex Webber
Alex Walker
James Davies
Rhys Jones
Rhys Shellard
Adam Warren
Jason Harries
Craig Price
Adam Thomas

Pool F

Coach:  Andrés Romagnoli
Nicolás Bruzzone
Valentin Cruz Hernestrosa
Jerónimo de la Fuente
Francisco Merello
Matías Moroni
Ramiro Moyano
Diego Palma
Anibal Panceyra Garrido
Facundo Panceyra Garrido
Ignacio Pasman
Gastón Revol (c)
Javier Rojas

Coach:  Ben Ryan
Jeff Williams
Michael John Ellery
Rob Vickerman
Dan Norton
James Rodwell
Tom Mitchell (c)
John Brake
Tom Powell
Marcus Watson
Christian Lewis-Pratt
Mat Turner
Mark Odejobi

Coach:  Dai Rees
Ka Chun Kwok
Eni Gesinde
Nick Hewson
Anthony Haynes
Lee Jones
Ben Rimene
Joshua Robert Peters
Alex McQueen
Rowan Varty (c)
Jamie Hood
Tom McQueen
Salom Yiu

Adérito Esteves
Duarte Moreira
Gonçalo Foro
Pedro Leal (c)
Diogo Miranda
Frederico Oliveira
Francisco de Almeida
David Mateus
Pedro Ávila
José Vareta
Rafael Simões
Miguel Lucas

References

Rugby World Cup Sevens squads
Squads